St. Paul's School is a bilingual international school in São Paulo, Brazil. The school's curriculum consists of three main courses: the Brazilian Core Curriculum, the British National Core Curriculum, and the International Baccalaureate Diploma Program. These are supported by a variety of artistic, cultural and sporting extra-curricular activities, field courses, and pastoral care. This school was formally established in 1926, when it was known as the Escola Britânica S.A. and accommodated 60 students including boarding facilities for male students. The school is externally audited by regular visits by inspectors from educational accreditation organisations such as HMC (Headmasters' and Headmistresses' Conference), IAPS (Incorporated Association of Preparatory Schools), LAHC (Latin American Heads' Conference), and MEC (Ministério da Educação).

St. Paul's School was the first Latin American School to be recognised by the UK government as a British Overseas School when it was first inspected in 2012. In 2006 its high standards was recognised by the British Guardian newspaper, listing it as one of the best UK-curriculum international schools in the world. In its 2019 BSO inspection, the school was judged as excellent in all areas (for both pupils' achievement and pupils' personal development).

Pupils who study at St. Paul's are referred to as "Pauleans".

History 

The St. Paul's School's foundation emerged from the considerable British presence in São Paulo in the early 20th century. The number of British families in the city had been increasing following the completion of the British owned São Paulo-Santos Railway in 1867 and attracted engineers, bankers, accountants and industrialists to the area from the United Kingdom. Drawing inspiration from the British schools established in Argentina, various British organisations joined together under the leadership of the São Paulo Railway Company to create a school to "provide a sound education for the sons and daughters of British parents".

In the 1960s and 1970s, St. Paul's became a co-educational day school for pupils aged 4–16. In the following decade, in response to a demand for preparation for university entrance in Brazil and overseas, the school registered with São Paulo education authorities as the Escola Britanica de São Paulo and introduced the International Baccalaureate Diploma. Sixth Formers first received their Segundo Grau certificate in 1983 and the first IB Diplomas were awarded in 1987.

Sports 
St. Paul's School is home to the St. Paul's Lions. They divide into both Varsity (ages 15 up) and Junior Varsity teams, in a range of sports, such as football, futsal, basketball and volleyball. They compete in the SPHSL (São Paulo High School League) which comprises five schools: Saint Paul's, Associação Escola Graduada de São Paulo (Graded), Escola Maria Imaculada (Chapel School), EAC Campinas (American School of Campinas) and the Pan American Christian Academy.

The school also holds yearly sporting events, such as the biathlon and sports festival. Students are encouraged to partake in these activities and are awarded house points for winning. The most successful House is awarded a grand prize at the end of every academic year.

References

International schools in Brazil
Educational institutions established in 1926
Private schools in Brazil
1926 establishments in Brazil